Gera Lario (Gera in lombard) is a comune (municipality) in the Province of Como in the Italian region Lombardy, located about  north of Milan and about  northeast of Como. As of 31 December 2004, it had a population of 942 and an area of 6.7 km².

Gera Lario borders the following municipalities: Colico, Dubino, Montemezzo, Piantedo, Sorico, Trezzone, Vercana.

Demographic evolution

References

Cities and towns in Lombardy